João Luiz de Avellar, better known simply as Luiz Avellar (born April 7, 1956 in Rio de Janeiro) is a Brazilian piano player.

He played with many of the best musicians of Brazil, including Nico Assumpção, Kiko Freitas and Ney Conceição.

He composed the soundtrack of several Rede Globo shows and telenovelas. Luiz Avellar also composed the soundtrack of the 2001 movie Tainá - Uma Aventura na Amazônia.

1956 births
Living people
Brazilian pianists
21st-century male pianists
Musicians from Rio de Janeiro (city)
21st-century Brazilian musicians